American Hot Rod is a reality television series that originally aired between 2004 and 2007 on The Learning Channel and Discovery Channel. The series followed renowned car designer Boyd Coddington and his crew as they built  hot rods and custom vehicles at his wheel and car shop  in La Habra, California. The show was known for its frequent rows and bust ups, and a high staff turnover rate. Some crew members went to work for Overhaulin's Chip Foose, a former partner of Coddington's, for a more relaxed environment; even Boyd's own son could not work there for long.

The series ended when Boyd Coddington died, following complications from surgery, in February 2008. The car shop closed on June 20, 2008.

Custom cars built during the series included the "Alumatub", a '61 Impala Bubbletop, a '63 Chevy Corvette Stingray, and a '42 Woodie. In July 2007, the shop made an Elvis Tribute Car, a modified 1957 pink Cadillac, sponsored by Reese’s.

Hot rod shop
 Boyd Coddington: shop owner, died suddenly on February 27, 2008 at the age of 63 due to complications after surgery
 Jo Coddington: Boyd's wife, appeared in all five seasons, ran the collectable store, consignment store, all corporate builds
 Diane Coddington: Boyd's ex-wife, ran accounting dept., appeared in Seasons One through Four until offices were moved when wheel shop was sold to American Racing
 Chris Coddington: Boyd's son, custom wheel sales dept., appeared in all five seasons, wheel division sold to American Racing during S4 but he appeared on S05E02 (Hershey Tribute Car)
 Tom Emmons: art director, appeared only in S03E01 (Make-A-Wish Max Hemi) but did most of the in-house artwork and drawings for Boyd
 Duane Mayer: shop foreman, appeared in all five seasons, now runs his own shop.
 Dan "Chicago" Sobieski: appeared in all five seasons, opened his own shop.
 Lee Hayes: sheet metal man, appeared in Seasons Two through Five working part-time, debuted in S02E12 ('63 Stingray 2/3)
 Robert Taylor: fabricator & assembler, appeared in Seasons Four and Five, debuted in S04E14 ('36 Roadster)
 Chad "Bluebear" Geary: assembler, appeared in Seasons One and Two, fired during S02E06 (Rat Rod Build Off) for insubordination
 Jimmy Pett: fabricator and assembler, appeared in Seasons One through Three, gone by Season Four
 Chris Smith: fabricator and assembler, appeared in Seasons Four and Five
 Tommy Puriton: janitor, appeared in all five seasons
 Keith "Flanders" Hickson: freelance exhaust fabricator, appeared in Season One
 Rick Rempel: metal worker, appeared in one build in Season Four, debuted in S04E20 (El Camino/White Cap truck), quit during S04E21 to return to Canada
 Scott Parker: appeared in Seasons Two through Four, quit during S04E10 after staying to help complete the '61 Impala Bubbletop build
 Mike Curtis: machine shop supervisor, appeared in Seasons One and Two, fired during S02E22 ('59 Chevy Low Rider) for working for competitor Chip Foose on the side.
 Roy Schmidt: metal worker, appears in Seasons One through Three, died of lung cancer on Oct. 27th, 2005 at the age of 64 during filming of S04E03 ('54 Corvette & '55 Chevy)
 Thomas Loddby: mechanic, appeared in Seasons One through Five, left during S03E02 (Max Hemi) to start a shipping business, returned in S04E11 ('40 Ford) working on a part-time basis
 Al Simon: chassis builder, appears in Seasons One through Five, quits during S02E14 (Bud Light car), returns during S02E22 ('59 Chevy Low Rider), and leaves again during S05/E08 ('59 Corvette)
 "Speedy" MacDonald: apprentice, appeared in Seasons Four and Five before leaving during S05E06 (Sobe Mercury Wagon) to return to Connecticut
 Jon Rockwell: metal fabricator, appeared in Season Four, debuted in S04E12 ('40 Ford), gone when Season Five began
 Sean Dooley: metal worker, appeared in one build in Season Two ('65 Mustang), fired during S02E01 for insubordination
 Jimmy Hudson: metal fabricator, appeared in Season Four, debuted in S04E11 ('40 Ford), quit during S04E18 ('40 Ford Woodie) for personal reasons
 Brad Johnston: fabricator, appeared in Seasons Two through Four, debuted during S02E18 (Hildebrandt Car), quit during S04E09 ('61 Impala Bubbletop) after being confronted about excessive absenteeism
 Liz Miles: apprentice, appeared in Season Five, debuted in S05E07 ('59 Corvette), fired during S05E08 reportedly over an alleged salary dispute and conflict with Boyd's wife Jo
 Tony Piro: apprentice, appeared in Season Four, debuted S04E04, laid off S04E05, returned as an intern on S04E06 (all '56 Chevy), and eventually fired S04E19 ('40 Ford Woodie) for lack of experience
 Jon Mayo: machinist, appeared in Seasons One and Two, quit during S02E08 ('42 Woodie) to move to Hawaii
 Kevin Christianson: machinist, appeared in all five seasons
 Chris Campbell: driver, appeared in Seasons Two through Four, fired during S04E04 ('56 Chevy) for multiple accidents and mishaps
 Ben Vasquez: fabricator and assembler, appeared in Seasons Four and Five
 Ken Whitney: assembler/electrical, appeared in Seasons Two through Four, had his own business named Wire 1 Hotrod specializing in wiring and computers, called in on an as needed basis
 Jeffrey "Scott" Howard: fabricator and assembler, appeared in Seasons One and Two, gone by Season Three
 Jimy "Tig" Kraus: apprentice, appeared in Seasons One and Two, fired during S02E02 ('65 Mustang) for lack of experience and alleged careless work habits
 Trish ???: metal worker, appeared in a couple of builds in Season Two, fired during S02E08 ('42 Woodie) for missing a day and not calling in
 Louie Biegler: metal worker, appeared in one build during Season Four, debuted and quit during S04E04 ('56 Chevy) because he couldn't keep up with the workload
 Albert Gillikin, Jr: metal worker, appeared briefly in Season Four, debuted in S04E04 ('56 Chevy)
 Mike Bennett: metal worker, appeared in Season Four, debuted in S04E04 ('56 Chevy)
 Memo Sanchez: limo driver, appeared in multiple seasons, fired by Duane during S05E11 (Bonneville racer) because assignments from Boyd were interfering with parts runs
 Willie Johnstone: assembler, appeared briefly in Season Two ('59 Chevy Low Rider)
 Craig Jull: fabricator, appeared in Season Five, debuted on S05E10 to help out with the Bonneville Racer build
 Robert Gallegos: apprentice, appeared in Season Five, debuted in S05E02 (Hershey Tribute Car)
 Bryan "Barney" Cantrell: fabricator, appeared in Season One only
 Chris Hoskins: intern, appeared in Season Two, debuted in S02E02 ('65 Mustang), left during S02E08 ('42 Woodie) to return to school in Chicago
 Al "Skeeter" ???: mechanic, appeared in Season Two, debuted in S02E19 (Hildebrant Car)
 Kevin "Dog" Gotch: intern, appeared in Season Two, debuted in S02E08 ('42 Woodie)
 Andreas Andersson: intern, appeared in Season One, debuted in S01E05 (Alumatub), quit during S01E06 after verbal abuse from Duane caused him to leave and return to Sweden
 James Gallando: machinist, appears in Season One (Junkyard Dog)

Body shop
 Justin Bergsto: body shop, appeared in Seasons Two through Five
 Rafael Garcia: body shop, appeared in Seasons One through Five
 Charley Hutton: painter & body shop supervisor, appeared in Seasons One and Two, quit during S02E10 ('42 Woodie) and opened his own shop Charley Hutton's Color Studio in Nampa, ID. He also appeared on Rides and Overhaulin''', and wins a Ridler Award with Chip Foose.
 Andrew "Beetle Bailey" Petterson: body man, appeared in Seasons One and Two, left in Season Two to join Charley Hutton
 Greg Morrell: painter & body shop, appeared in Seasons Three through Five, debuted on S03E02 (Max Hemi)
 Bernt Karlsson: body shop, painter, appeared in Seasons Two through Five, debuted in S02E12 ('63 Stingray) as an independent contractor, then came aboard full-time on S02E15 (Bud Light Car).
 Brian ????: body shop apprentice, appeared in Seasons One and Two, gone when Season Three began
 Jose ????: body shop, appeared in Seasons Three through Five
 Paul Fortin: body shop, appeared in Seasons Three through Five, debuted on S03E02 (Max Hemi)
 Mike Rhodes: body shop, appeared briefly in Season Two, debuted in S3E13 for '63 Corvette build

Episodes

Season 1

Season 2

Season 3

Season 4

 Season 5 

See also
 American Chopper Monster Garage Overhaulin' Pimp My Ride Trick My Truck''

References

External links
 
 Pilgrim Films & Television page
 Boyd Coddington Helps Exhume Buried 1957 Plymouth Belvedere in Tulsa, Oklahoma
 Boyd Coddington Virtual Museum

2004 American television series debuts
2007 American television series endings
Automotive television series
Discovery Channel original programming
La Habra, California
Vehicle modification media